The 2018 Thailand Champions Cup was the 2nd Thailand Champions Cup, an annual football match contested by the winners of the previous season's Thai League 1 and Thai FA Cup competitions. It was sponsored by Government Savings Bank (Omsin Bank), and known as the Omsin Thailand Champions Cup for sponsorship purposes. The match was played at Supachalasai Stadium, Bangkok and contested by 2017 Thai League T1 champions Buriram United, and Chiangrai United as the champions of the 2017 Thai FA Cup.

Qualified teams

Match

Details

Assistant referees:
 Pattarapong Kusathit
 Rawut Nakarit
Fourth official:
 Mongkolchai Pechsri

Winner

See also
 2018 Thai League
 2018 Thai League 2
 2018 Thai League 3
 2018 Thai League 4
 2018 Thailand Amateur League
 2018 Thai FA Cup
 2018 Thai League Cup

References

2018 in Thai football cups
Thailand Champions Cup
Thailand Champions Cup
2018
Thailand Champions Cup 2018